Mary Miller may refer to:
Mary Miller (actress) (1929–2020), English actress
Mary Miller (art historian) (born 1952), American art historian
Mary Miller (artistic director) (active since 1990), artistic director of the Bergen National Opera, Norway
Mary Miller (Colorado businesswoman) (1843–1921), founder of Lafayette, Colorado
Mary Miller (politician) (born 1959), U.S. Representative
Mary Miller (soprano) (c.1926 - 1949), Australian singer
Mary Miller (writer) (active since 2009), American fiction writer
Mary A. Miller (active 1858–1907), American missionary editor
Mary J. Miller (born 1955), U.S. Under Secretary of the Treasury
Mary K. Miller (born 1957), American country singer
Mary Millicent Miller (1846–1894), American steamboat master
Mary Rogers Miller (1868–1971), American writer and educator
Mary Durack Miller (1913–1994), Australian author and historian

See also
Mary Boykin Chesnut (née Miller, 1823–1886), American diarist
Mary Miller Glasscock (1872–1925), wife of former West Virginia governor, William E. Glasscock
Mary Millar (1936–1998), British actress of Keeping Up Appearances